A Curtain of Green was the first collection of short stories written by Eudora Welty. In these stories, Welty looks at the state of Mississippi through the eyes of its inhabitants, the common people, both black and white, and presents a realistic view of the racial relations that existed at the time. Welty, though, looks past race, not overtly focusing on the subject, and sees Mississippi as what it is. The stories subtly combine myth and reality to create portraits of odd, but undeniable, beauty. One of the finest pieces in the collection is titled "A Worn Path." Welty's skill as a writer perhaps reaches its finest point with this story of an aging woman who faces her greatest obstacle, the journey of life as she tries to cope with the grief from the death of her grandson she goes through a journey comparable to a Greek epic. Full of challenges that she had to overcome while still keeping her dignity. Welty writes "A Worn Path" to show the reader that even though they are not an epic hero they can still have dignity in their life.

Stories in the collection
"Lily Daw and the Three Ladies"
"A Piece of News"
"Petrified Man"
"The Key"
"Keela, the Outcast Indian Maiden"
"Why I Live at the P.O."
"The Whistle"
"The Hitch-Hikers"
"A Memory"
"Clytie"
"Old Mr. Marblehall"
"Flowers for Marjorie"
"A Curtain of Green"
"A Visit of Charity"
"Death of a Traveling Salesman"
"Powerhouse"
"A Worn Path"

Reception

Marianne Hauser, reviewing the book for The New York Times on November 18, 1941, praises "the author's fanatic love of people. With a few lines she draws the gesture of a deaf-mute, the windblown skirts of a Negro woman in the fields, the bewilderment of a child in the sickroom of an old people's asylum--and she has told more than many an author might tell in a novel of six hundred pages".

Katherine Anne Porter, who wrote the book's Introduction, said: These stories offer an extraordinary range of mood, pace, tone, and variety of material. The scene is limited to a town the author knows well; the farthest reaches of that scene never go beyond the boundaries of her own state....Dullness, bitterness, self-pity, baseness of all kinds can be most interesting material for a story provided these are not also the main elements in the mind of the author. There is nothing in the least vulgar or frustrated in Miss Welty's mind. She has simply an eye and an ear sharp, shrewd, and true as a tuning fork.

References
 

1941 short story collections
American short story collections
Short story collections by Eudora Welty
Doubleday (publisher) books
Mississippi in fiction